Carrier Air Wing, released in Japan as , is a 1990 side-scrolling shooting game released for the CP System arcade hardware by Capcom. It is the spiritual successor to U.N. Squadron, which was released in the previous year. As with the original, players chose any one of three different jet fighters and battle their way through ten enemy-packed stages. Other ideas carried over from U.N. Squadron include the shop, which allows players to buy weapon and shield upgrades for their jet fighter between stages, and the energy bar, which is replaced by a "fuel bar" which starts full at the start of each stage and decreases as time passes with some fuel lost each time the plane is damaged. The game has two different endings, depending on whether the game is finished with only one coin or not. A version for the Capcom Power System Changer was planned and previewed but never released.

Plot

During the decade of the nineties, many things in the world have changed. Growing cooperation between old rivals and friendships between the superpowers of the globe were examples of such occurring changes in political and economical scenarios of the world, but this fragile peace was not to last for long. In the year 1997, the fictional Middle Eastern country of Rabu has built several weapons of mass destruction, such as ICBMs, tactical nuclear bombs, and even a satellite-based tactical laser weapon, able to strike anywhere in the world.

With such weaponry in hand and benefiting from several terrorists over the world, Rabu was ready to declare war on mankind and aspire to their dream of global conquest.

An emergency call arrives to the U.S. government when in 1999, Rabu strikes Tokyo, Japan with its extensive weaponry. The Americans decide to fight back against Rabu, and the USS Carl Vinson (CVN-70) slips out to sea carrying three of the finest Navy fighter pilots in the world: Rick Ford, Mark Olson, and James Roy, launching them on a campaign to remove the threat of Rabu and bring peace and freedom back to the world.

The greatest air war in human history is about to begin...

Reception 

In Japan, Game Machine listed Carrier Air Wing on their December 1, 1990 issue as being the most-successful table arcade unit of the month, outperforming titles such as Raiden and Columns II. In the January 1991 issue of Japanese publication Micom BASIC Magazine, the game was ranked on the number eight spot in popularity. In May 1991, UK magazine Zero ranked it on their number three spot in popularity. Martin Gaksch of German magazine Power Play gave the game a mixed outlook.

References

External links 

 Carrier Air Wing at GameFAQs
 Carrier Air Wing at Giant Bomb
 Carrier Air Wing at Killer List of Videogames
 Carrier Air Wing at MobyGames

1990 video games
Arcade video games
Arcade-only video games
Cancelled Capcom Power System Changer games
Capcom games
Cooperative video games
CP System games
Horizontally scrolling shooters
Video games developed in Japan
Video games scored by Manami Matsumae
Video games set in 1999
Aircraft carriers in fiction